Uffe Jensen from Venstre was seeking a third term for this election. Despite coming behind the Social Democrats in the 2015 Danish general election and the 2019 Danish general election in votes of Odder municipality
, Venstre had become the largest party in the 2017 Odder municipal election.

In this election, Venstre would again become the biggest party, and retain 7 seats despite decreasing their vote share by 7.4%.
Danish People's Party would however lose a seat, while the Danish Social Liberal Party would gain 1. This meant that the parties of the traditional red bloc had a majority, and it was announced that Lone Jakobi from the Social Democrats would become the new mayor.

Electoral system
For elections to Danish municipalities, a number varying from 9 to 31 are chosen to be elected to the municipal council. The seats are then allocated using the D'Hondt method and a closed list proportional representation.
Odder Municipality had 19 seats in 2021

Unlike in Danish General Elections, in elections to municipal councils, electoral alliances are allowed.

Electoral alliances  

Electoral Alliance 1

Electoral Alliance 2

Results

Notes

References 

Odder